A Würstelstand (literally "sausage stand"; plural Würstelstände) is a traditional Austrian street food retail outlet selling hot dogs, sausages, and side dishes.  They are a ubiquitous sight in Vienna.

History
Würstelstände were initially movable stalls created during the period of the Austro-Hungarian Empire to provide a source of income for disabled veterans. Not until the 1960s were the sales stands allowed to become stationary. Especially in Vienna's inner city, many of them can be found near transit hubs and around subway stations, providing a late evening catering for night owls. In some Austrian cities, mobile Würstelstände hold operating licenses only for nighttime sales.

See also

 List of hot dog restaurants
 List of restaurants in Vienna

References

Further reading
 Elisabeth Hölzl, Im Banne der Burenwurst: Der Würstelstand als Wille und Vorstellung. Christian Brandstätter, Wien 2001,  (in German).
 Peter Payer, Der Geschmack der Stadt. Der Wiener Würstelstand – Nahversorger und Imageproduzent.  (In German.)

External links

 Würstelstand - Der Film

Food retailers of Austria
Street food
Hot dog restaurants
Austrian cuisine